Sergei Fokin may refer to:
Sergei Fokin (footballer), Soviet footballer
Sergei Fokin (ice hockey), Soviet ice hockey player